Crumbs and Whiskers is a small business which operates cat cafés that foster rescue cats and offer cafe amenities, in  and Los Angeles, California. Crumbs & Whiskers partners with rescues who save cats at risk of euthanasia in high kill shelters and cats facing homelessness on the streets.

By housing cats who have nowhere else to go, they reduce the number of cats who are killed in the cities they operate in simply because there's no more space for them. By housing homeless cats in a unique space and marketing their profiles in a different way than shelters do, Crumbs and Whiskers significantly increases the exposure shelter cats get to potential adopters, which in turn, increases the adoption rates at their partner rescues.

Crumbs and Whiskers opened its first cat café in Washington on June 20, 2015; this was the first cat café to open in the Washington metropolitan area. The Washington D.C. café is partnered with Homeward Trails Animal Rescue, and provides a living space for around 20–25 cats at a time. Through the partnership arrangement, the Homeward Trails provides vaccinated and vetted cats to Crumbs and Whiskers, which functions as a foster home for the cats until they are adopted.

The Los Angeles café opened on September 30, 2016, and was the first cat café to open in the Los Angeles metropolitan area. The Los Angeles café is partnered with Stray Cat Alliance, a Los Angeles-based animal rescue which provides cats for the café. Similar to the Washington D.C. café, the Los Angeles café offers a living space for the cats until they are adopted.

Crumbs and Whiskers uses an online booking system for scheduling visits and offers a fixed admission price per visit. For safety reasons, children under 18 must have a waiver signed by an adult. Crumbs and Whiskers allows customers to begin the application process for adopting one of the cats on site at their cafés.

Startup funding

The business founder, Kanchan Singh, opted to finance the venture by crowdfunding through a Kickstarter project with a  target, an amount which she was initially uncertain that she could raise.  The Crumbs and Whiskers Kickstarter project reached its funding target less than a day after it launched, and doubled this amount prior to the project deadline. The campaign ended with 705 backers and raised a total of $35,881 for the café.

References
Notes

Sources

Cat organizations
Coffeehouses and cafés in the United States
Tourist attractions in Washington, D.C.
Tourist attractions in Los Angeles
Entertainment venues in Washington, D.C.
Entertainment venues in California
2015 establishments in Washington, D.C.
2016 establishments in California
Restaurants in Los Angeles
Restaurants in Washington, D.C.